LaTanya Richardson Jackson ( Richardson; born October 21, 1949) is an American actress. She began her career appearing in off-Broadway productions, before playing supporting roles on television and film.

Richardson has appeared in films including Fried Green Tomatoes (1991), Malcolm X (1992), Sleepless in Seattle (1993), When a Man Loves a Woman (1994), Losing Isaiah (1995), Lone Star (1996), U.S. Marshals (1998), and The Fighting Temptations (2003). Her television credits include 100 Centre Street (2001–2002), Show Me a Hero (2015), Luke Cage (2016–2018), and Rebel (2017).

Personal life 
She was born in Atlanta, Georgia. While attending Atlanta's historically black, all-female Spelman College in 1970, she met actor Samuel L. Jackson, then a student at historically black, all-male Morehouse College. She and Jackson married in 1980. As of 2020, they have been together 50 years, according to Samuel's tribute post on Instagram. They have one child, freelance film and TV producer Zoe Jackson, born in 1982. After her daughter's birth, Richardson stopped working regularly, because, she said: "We'd vowed to be an intact revolutionary black family. But it was very, very hard."

Career 
To date, Richardson's biggest role in a motion picture was in the 2003 musical The Fighting Temptations in which she appears as the main antagonist, the hypercritical Paulina Pritchett.

In 2014, Richardson received a Tony Award nomination for Best Lead Actress in a Play for her performance in the play A Raisin in the Sun. This was her second appearance on Broadway after her debut in the 2009 revival of Joe Turner's Come and Gone. She also appeared in Aaron Sorkin's adaptation of To Kill a Mockingbird on Broadway in the 2018–19 season.

She has appeared in four films with her husband: "Juice" (1992), Losing Isaiah (1995), Freedomland (2006), and Mother and Child (2009).

In September 2022, Richardson made her directorial debut directing, among others, her husband Samuel in a Broadway revival of August Wilson's play The Piano Lesson at the Ethel Barrymore Theatre.

Filmography

Film

Television

Theatre

Awards and nominations

References

External links 
 
 

1949 births
20th-century American actresses
21st-century American actresses
Actresses from Atlanta
African-American actresses
American film actresses
American television actresses
American stage actresses
Living people
Spelman College alumni